The 2016 American Ethanol E15 225 was the 16th stock car race of the 2016 NASCAR Camping World Truck Series, the final race of the regular season, and the 8th iteration of the event. The race was held on Friday, September 16, 2016, in Joilet, Illinois, at Chicagoland Speedway, a 1.5-mile (2.4 km) permanent tri-oval shaped racetrack. The race was increased from 150 laps to 151 laps, due to a NASCAR overtime finish. Kyle Busch, driving for his own team, Kyle Busch Motorsports, held off Daniel Hemric and Cameron Hayley in the final 2 laps, and earned his 46th career NASCAR Camping World Truck Series win, along with his second of the season. Busch dominated the majority of the race, leading 95 laps.

The eight drivers to qualify for the inaugural Truck Series playoffs are William Byron, Matt Crafton, John Hunter Nemechek, Christopher Bell, Johnny Sauter, Ben Kennedy, Daniel Hemric, and Timothy Peters.

Background 

Chicagoland Speedway is a  tri-oval speedway in Joliet, Illinois, southwest of Chicago. The speedway opened in 2001 and actively hosted NASCAR racing including the NASCAR Cup Series until 2019. Until 2010, the speedway has also hosted the IndyCar Series, recording numerous close finishes including the closest finish in IndyCar history. The speedway is currently owned and operated by Nascar.

Entry list 

 (R) denotes rookie driver.
 (i) denotes driver who is ineligible for series driver points.

Practice

First practice 
The first practice session was held on Thursday, September 15, at 3:00 pm CST, and would last for 55 minutes.

Final practice 
The final practice session was held on Thursday, September 15, at 5:30 pm CST, and would last for 55 minutes.

Qualifying 
Qualifying was held on Friday, September 16, at 3:45 pm CST. Since Chicagoland Speedway is at least 1.5 miles (2.4 km) in length, the qualifying system was a single car, single lap, two round system where in the first round, everyone would set a time to determine positions 13–32. Then, the fastest 12 qualifiers would move on to the second round to determine positions 1–12.

Full qualifying results

Race results

Standings after the race 

Drivers' Championship standings

Note: Only the first 8 positions are included for the driver standings.

References 

NASCAR races at Chicagoland Speedway
September 2016 sports events in the United States
2016 in sports in Illinois